William Russell Bowker (1855 - 16 July 1916) was an early and prominent South African settler in Kenya.

Early life
Bowker was born in Grahamstown, Cape Colony. He was the eleventh child of Bertram Egerton Bowker, who had migrated from Northumberland, England to South Africa with the 1820 Settlers. Bowker served with distinction during the Boer War.

East Africa
Bowker first visited the East Africa Protectorate in 1901 and became impressed by the farming and ranching opportunities in the new country. On his return to South Africa, motivated by Sir Charles Eliot's call for settlers, he sold his estates and recruited a group of aspiring farmers keen to settle in the Protectorate. In 1904 he returned to the Protectorate and impressed Eliot with his efforts to encourage settlement. He made an application for land, and was granted a lease for 30,000 acres in the Kedong valley.

In 1907, together with Ewart Grogan and others, he was involved in an altercation with three Kikuyu men in Nairobi. The incident achieved notoriety at the time due to the heavy handedness of Bowker and his accomplices. Despite his protestations of innocence, the government was keen to set an example and arrested him for illegal assembly, later sentencing him to fourteen days imprisonment and a fine of 250 rupees.

During the First World War he organised a group of irregulars and raised a cavalry known as Bowker's Horse. He died from pneumonia whilst on the field on 16 July 1916 and was buried at Mount Margaret in the Kedong valley.

References

1855 births
1916 deaths
British Kenya people
Settlers of Kenya
White Kenyan people